DRI or D.R.I. may stand for:

Business
 DRI, the NYSE stock symbol for Darden Restaurants, Inc.
 Digital Research Inc, first large software company in the business for microcomputers
 Data Resources Inc., a former distributor of economic data, now part of IHS Global Insight
 Diamond Resorts International Inc. a vacation ownership company

Computing
 Declarative referential integrity, in databases
 Direct Rendering Infrastructure, a software interface
 Digital Research Infrastructure, tools and services underpinning and supporting scientific research

Government
 United States District Court for the District of Rhode Island
 Directorate of Revenue Intelligence, Intelligence Agency of India

Healthcare and bioscience
 Dietary Reference Intake, dietary recommendation
 Doncaster Royal Infirmary, South Yorkshire, UK
 Dopamine reuptake inhibitor, class of drugs
 Former Dundee Royal Infirmary, Scotland, UK

Other organisations
 Desert Research Institute, environmental research
Direct Relief, health NGO
Directly Responsible Individual, Project specific title in Apple Computer's Corporate ecosystem.
 Disaster Recovery Institute

Other
 Direct reduced iron, used in steel production
 D.R.I. (band), Dirty Rotten Imbeciles, an American crossover thrash band